J. J. Jackson may refer to:

 J. J. Jackson (singer) (born 1941), American soul/R&B singer
 J. J. Jackson (media personality) (1941–2004), American radio and television personality

See also
 Jackson (name)